Zafarani may refer to:

Zafarani, Iran, a village in Ilam Province, Iran
Zafarani, Razavi Khorasan, a village in Razavi Khorasan Province, Iran
Zafarani Islands, off Morocco
Jafar Zafarani, Iranian academic